The New York Public Library Desk Reference, in its fourth edition as of 2014, is a one volume general reference work.  According to the OCLC (2005 report) it is one of the most widely held general reference works by contributing libraries, ranked after multi-volume works The World Book Encyclopedia, Encyclopedia Americana and Collier's Encyclopedia, but slightly ahead of the New Encyclopædia Britannica.

Editions
Excluding editions focused on specific subjects, The New York Public Library Desk Reference has been published in these years and editions:
 1st: 1989.
 2nd: 1993.
 3rd: 1998.
 4th: 2002.

References

Single-volume general reference works
New York Public Library